Senator Ortiz may refer to:

Deborah Ortiz (born 1957), California State Senate
Eder E. Ortiz Ortiz (born 1969), Senate of Puerto Rico
José E. Meléndez Ortiz, Senate of Puerto Rico